Ezzat ol Din (also Romanized as ‘Ezzat ol Dīn, ‘Ezzat Ed Dīn, and ‘Ezzat od Dīn) is a village in Miandorud-e Bozorg Rural District, in the Central District of Miandorud County, Mazandaran Province, Iran. At the 2006 census, its population was 956, in 252 families.

References 

Populated places in Miandorud County